Homer Hiller Henry Hillebrand (October 10, 1879January 20, 1974) was a professional baseball player who played three seasons for the Pittsburgh Pirates of Major League Baseball.

Hillebrand played college baseball at Princeton University.

References

Major League Baseball pitchers
Major League Baseball first basemen
Pittsburgh Pirates players
Baseball players from Illinois
People from Freeport, Illinois
Princeton Tigers baseball players
1879 births
1974 deaths
Flandreau Indians players
Los Angeles (minor league baseball) players
Oakland Oaks (baseball) players